{{Automatic taxobox
|image=Rissoella opalina.png
|image_caption=Live Rissoella opalina
|taxon=Rissoella
|authority=Gray, 1847
|synonyms_ref=
|synonyms=
 Heterorissoa 
 Jeffreysia 
 Jeffreysiella Thiele, 1912
 Jeffreysina 
 Jeffreysiopsis 
 Rissoella (Jeffreysiella) 
 Rissoella (Phycodrosus) Rehder, 1943
 Rissoella (Rissoella) 
 Rissoella (Zelaxitas 
 Zelaxitas 
|type_species=Rissoella diaphana
|type_species_authority=(Alder, 1848)
|display_parents= 3
}}Rissoella''' is a genus of minute sea snails, marine gastropods, in the family Rissoellidae. 

Species
According to the World Register of Marine Species (WoRMS), the following species with valid names are included within the genus RissoellaSynonyms
 Rissoella bakeri A. M. Strong, 1938: synonym of Elachisina bakeri (A. M. Strong, 1938)
 Rissoella bifasciata (Carpenter, 1857): synonym of Barleeia bifasciata (Carpenter, 1856)
 Rissoella californica Bartsch, 1927: synonym of Elachisina grippi Dall, 1918
 Rissoella duperrei (Vélain, 1877): synonym of Eatoniella duperrei (Vélain, 1877)
 Rissoella excolpa Bartsch, 1920: synonym of Elachisina grippi Dall, 1918
 Rissoella glaber Gray, 1847: synonym of Rissoella glabra Gray, 1847: synonym of Rissoella diaphana (Alder, 1848) (wrong gender agreement)
 Rissoella glabra Gray, 1847: synonym of Rissoella diaphana (Alder, 1848)
 Rissoella johnstoni F. Baker, Hanna & A. M. Strong, 1930: synonym of Elachisina johnstoni (F. Baker, Hanna & A. M. Strong, 1930)
 Rissoella paupercula (C. B. Adams, 1852): synonym of Barleeia paupercula (C. B. Adams, 1852)
 Rissoella punicea (Laseron, 1950): synonym of Rissoella secunda (Iredale, 1912)

References

 Gofas, S.; Le Renard, J.; Bouchet, P. (2001). Mollusca, in: Costello, M.J. et al. (Ed.) (2001). European register of marine species: a check-list of the marine species in Europe and a bibliography of guides to their identification. Collection Patrimoines Naturels, 50: pp. 180–213
 Ponder, W.F. (1966). The New Zealand species previously known as Zelaxitas Finlay, 1927 (Mollusca Gastropoda). Records of the Dominion Museum 5: 163–176
 Spencer, H.; Marshall. B. (2009). All Mollusca except Opisthobranchia''. In: Gordon, D. (Ed.) (2009). New Zealand Inventory of Biodiversity. Volume One: Kingdom Animalia. 584 pp
 Petit R.E. (2012) John Edward Gray (1800-1875): his malacological publications and molluscan taxa. Zootaxa 3214: 1-125. page(s): 101

External links
 Gray J.E. (1847). A list of the genera of recent Mollusca, their synonyma and types. Proceedings of the Zoological Society of London. 15: 129-219
  Thiele, J. (1912). Die antarktischen Schnecken und Muscheln. Deutsche Südpolar-Expedition 1901-1903. Wissenschaftliche Ergebnisse. 13, Zoologie. 5(2): 185-285, pls 11-19.
 Finlay H.J. (1926). A further commentary on New Zealand molluscan systematics. Transactions of the New Zealand Institute. 57: 320-485, pls 18-23
 Iredale, T. (1912). New generic names and new species of marine Mollusca. Proceedings of the Malacological Society of London. 10(3): 217-228
 Robertson R. 1962. Supplementary notes on the Rissoellidae. Notulae Naturae, The Academy of Natural Sciences of Philadelphia, 352: 1-2
 Natural History Museum Rotterdam: images of Rissoella
 Spencer H.G., Willan R.C., Marshall B.A. & Murray T.J. (2011) Checklist of the Recent Mollusca Recorded from the New Zealand Exclusive Economic Zone

Rissoellidae
Gastropod genera
Taxa named by John Edward Gray